Silvino Adolfo Morais (19 July 1956 – 3 January 2022) was an East Timorese politician. A member of Fretilin, he served in the National Parliament from 2018 to 2022. He died of a heart attack on 3 January 2022, at the age of 65.

References

1956 births
2022 deaths
Fretilin politicians
Members of the National Parliament (East Timor)
People from Bobonaro District